Leticia (derived from the Latin greeting laetitia meaning joy, gladness, delight) may refer to:

People 
Given name
 Saint Leticia, a venerated virgin martyr, saint
 Queen Letizia of Spain (born 1972), queen consort of Spain
 Leticia Avilés, Ecuadoran evolutionary biologist and ecologist
 Letícia Birkheuer (born 1978), Brazilian model and actress
 Leticia Brédice (born 1975), Argentine actress and singer
 Letícia Bufoni (born 1993), Brazilian-American professional street skateboarder
 Leticia Cáceres (born 1978), Australian stage and film director
 Leticia Calderón (born 1968), Mexican actress
 Leticia Cline (born 1978), American model
 Letícia Colin (born 1989), Brazilian actress and singer
 Letícia Costa (born 1995), Brazilian artistic gymnast
 Leticia Costas (born 1990), Spanish tennis player.
 Leticia Cossettini (1904-2004), Argentine teacher, pedagogue
 Leticia Cugliandolo (born 1965), Argentine condensed matter physicist
 Leticia Dolera (born 1981), Spanish actress
 Leticia Dutra (born 1993), Brazilian group rhythmic gymnast
 Leticia Gempisao (1951/1952–2021), Filipino softball player
 Leticia Gil (born 1982), Spanish road cyclist 
 Leticia Gómez-Tagle, Mexican pianist and piano teacher
 Leticia Hage (born 1990), Brazilian female volleyball player
 Leticia Herrera Sánchez (born 1949), Nicaraguan lawyer, guerrilla leader, and politician
 Leticia Huijara (born 1967), Mexican actress
 Letícia Izidoro Lima da Silva (born 1994), Brazilian footballer, commonly known as Letícia or Lelê, 
 Leticia Lee (1964–2020), pro-Beijing activist in Hong Kong
 Leticia López Landero (born 1962), Mexican politician
 Leticia Martínez (born 1988), Paraguayan handball player 
 Leticia Moreno (born 1985), Spanish violinist
 Letícia Oliveira (born 1976), Cape Verdean basketball player
 Leticia Orozco Torres (born 1953), Mexican politician
 Leticia de Oyuela (1935–2008), Honduran historian
 Letícia Parente (1930–1991), Brazilian visual artist 
 Leticia Peiris (1934–2013) Sri Lankan actress in Sri Lankan cinema, theater and television
 Leticia Perdigón (born 1956), Mexican film and television actress
 Letícia Persiles (born 1983), Brazilian actress and singer
 Leticia Rajapakse, Ceylonese social worker
 Leticia Ramos-Shahani (1929–2017), Filipina senator and writer
 Leticia Remauro, American businesswoman, politician, and author
 Leticia Ribeiro (born 1979), Brazilian jiu-jitsu black belt and multiple time world champion
 Letícia Román (née Novarese; born 1941), Italian film actress
 Leticia Romero González (born 1995), Spanish basketball player
 Letícia Sabatella (born 1971), Brazilian actress and singer
 Leticia Sabater (born 1966), Spanish television presenter, actress and singer
 Letícia Santos (born 1994), Brazilian footballer 
 Leticia Scury or Scuri (c. 1890–1950), Argentine actress
 Leticia Siciliani (born 1992), Argentinean actress and singer
 Letícia Silva, Brazilian beauty pageant titleholder 
 Letícia Sobral (born 1980), Brazilian tennis player
 Leticia Spiller (born 1973), Brazilian actress.
 Leticia de Souza (born 1996), Brazilian sprinter
 Leticia Suárez (born 1969), Cuban table tennis player
 Leticia Teleguario, Kaqchikel politician and Indigenous rights activist
 Leticia Tonos, Dominican director, producer and screenwriter
 Leticia Userralde (born 1961), Mexican politician
 Leticia Van de Putte (born 1954), American politician
 Leticia Vasquez, American politician, mayor

Middle name
 Juana Leticia Herrera Ale (born 1960), Mexican politician

Places 
 Leticia, Amazonas, a municipality in Amazonas, Colombia

Others
Apostolic Vicariate of Leticia (Latin: Apostolicus Vicariatus Laetitiae) in the Catholic Church is located in the city of Leticia, Amazonas in Colombia
 Leticia Incident (1932–35), a border conflict between Colombia and Peru
 A doll in the Groovy Girls doll line by Manhattan Toy
 Leticia Bongnino, a recurring fictional character from the Singaporean sitcom The Noose

See also 
 Laetitia (disambiguation), a variant of Leticia
 Letizia, a variant of Leticia

Feminine given names